Cicindela sylvicola is a species of ground beetle native to Europe, where it can be found in Austria, Belgium, Bosnia and Herzegovina, Bulgaria, Croatia, the Czech Republic, mainland France, Germany, Hungary, mainland Italy, Luxembourg, Moldova, North Macedonia, Poland, Romania, southern Russia, Slovenia, Switzerland, Ukraine and Serbia.

References

External links

sylvicola
Beetles described in 1822
Beetles of Europe